(Under the Free Sun: a Story of the Ancient Grandfathers) is a historical novel by the Slovene writer Fran Saleški Finžgar.  The work was initially published in 1906 and 1907 as a feuilleton in the conservative newspaper Dom in svet. It was published in the book form in 1912. It is an extensive narrative oeuvre with nationally motivated content.

Story
The novel discusses the settlement of the Slavs in the Balkan Peninsula, when they still lived freely, not subjugated, and without a supreme leader. The novel includes a love story of Iztok, a Slavic warrior travelling to Constantinople (archaic Slovene: Bizanc) and Irena, a court woman there. It idyllically depicts the Slavs as pagans living in harmony with nature.

Cultural references
In 2004, a radio serial, written after the novel by the director Jože Vozny, was recorded by the Slovenian national radio. It was broadcast in summer 2016.
In November 2016, the Jurij Slatkonja Vocal Academy (mixed choir) from Novo Mesto in collaboration with a number of solo singers premiered an opera based on this novel in the city's cultural centre. It was written by the Slovene composer Tom Kobe (born 1988), and it featured the Italian tenor Domingo Stasi and the Croatian bariton Siniša Hapač.

See also
List of Slovenian novels

References

Slovene-language novels
Novels by Fran Saleški Finžgar
1907 novels
Historical novels
Novels set in the Byzantine Empire